NBA Africa Game may refer to:

NBA Africa Game 2015
NBA Africa Game 2017
NBA Africa Game 2018

National Basketball Association games